Iris Rezende Machado (22 December 1933 – 9 November 2021) was a Brazilian politician who was a member of the Brazilian Democratic Movement (MDB).

Biography

Rezende made his career in the state of Goiás, being City Councillor and Mayor of Goiânia, State Deputy in Goiás, State Governor for two terms, Minister of Agriculture during José Sarney government, and Minister of Justice in the government of Fernando Henrique Cardoso. He was married to Homonymous Íris Araújo. City Councillor in 1958, State Deputy in 1962, and Mayor of Goiânia in 1965, Rezende was removed from office by the military regime in 1969.

He was elected Governor of Goiás in 1982, but resigned after his nomination for the Ministry of Agriculture by president Sarney. Rejzende returned to the State Government in 1991, where he remained in office until his second resignation in 1994 to run for the Federal Senate. He was elected to the Senate and took office in 1995.

In 1997, Renzende was invited to become the Minister of Justice by president Fernando Henrique Cardoso.

In 1998, Rezende ran for Governor again, but lost the election to Marconi Perillo (PSDB). In 2002, he ran for re-election as Senator with Mauro Miranda (PMDB), but both lost their seats to Demóstenes Torres (PFL) and Lucia Vânia (PSDB).

In 2004, Rezende ran for Mayor of Goiãnia one more time, gathering 299,272 votes, or 47.47% of the valid votes, qualifying for the second round. Weeks later, he beat the incumbent Mayor Pedro Wilson (PT), with 56% of the valid votes.

He was re-elected Mayor of Goiânia in the 2008 elections. On 1 April 2010, he resigned to run for Governor of Goiás in the same year election. The incumbent Vice Mayor Paulo Garcia took office as Mayor. In October, Rezende was defeated again by Marconi Perillo in the second round.

In February 2013, the Justice Court of Goiás reformed a 1st instance decision, acquitting Rezende of the charges of administrative improbity.

Rezende was elected Mayor of Goiânia for the fourth time in the second round of the 2016 elections. He gathered 57.70% of the valid votes.

References

External links
 
 

|-

|-

|-

|-

|-

|-

1933 births
2021 deaths
Mayors of Goiânia
Governors of Goiás
Ministers of Justice of Brazil
Agriculture ministers of Brazil
Energy ministers of Brazil
Members of the Federal Senate (Brazil)
Members of the Legislative Assembly of Goiás
Goiás politicians
Brazilian Democratic Movement politicians
Deaths from the COVID-19 pandemic in São Paulo (state)